"Mona Lisas and Mad Hatters (Part Two)" is a song by English musician Elton John and songwriter Bernie Taupin from the album Reg Strikes Back. It was released as a 12" single in 1988 only in the United States. The single did not include the basic version from Reg Strikes Back album.

Although not a particularly popular song, some critics judged it as a "most intriguing" song or the "brightest moment" of the album. John said: "That's probably my favorite track on the album. It just has a great New York feel". He played both versions of the song sequentially in concerts from the release of "Mona Lisas and Mad Hatters (Part Two)" in 1988 through to 1993.

Lyrics and composition 
The song is about New York City and is a continuation of the song "Mona Lisas and Mad Hatters" from the 1972 album Honky Château. Although the song follows the same meaning of its predecessor, it has a very different tempo and instrumental arrangement, and is in many ways a more complex song, with a variety of key changes and unusual chords throughout the song. There is also a brief homage to the Beatles' song "Drive My Car" that can be heard during the trumpet solo, where Elton and the backup singers interject "beep beep, beep beep, yeah!".

Track listing
 12"
 "Mona Lisas and Mad Hatters Part Two (The Renaissance Mix)" – 6:15
 "Mona Lisas and Mad Hatters Part Two (The Da Vinci Version)" – 4:47
 "A Word in Spanish" – 4:35
 "Mona Lisas and Mad Hatters Part Two (Self Portrait Instrumental)" – 4:55

Personnel 
 Elton John – Roland RD-1000 digital piano, lead vocals
 Fred Mandel – synthesizers
 Davey Johnstone – electric guitars, backing vocals
 David Paton – bass
 Charlie Morgan – drums
 Dee Murray – backing vocals
 Nigel Olsson – backing vocals
 Freddie Hubbard – trumpet, flugelhorn

References

1988 songs
Elton John songs
Songs about New York City
Songs with music by Elton John
Songs with lyrics by Bernie Taupin
Song recordings produced by Chris Thomas (record producer)
Sequel songs